Ride (Music from the Dimension Motion Picture) is the soundtrack to Millicent Shelton's 1998 film Ride. It was released on January 27, 1998 (exactly 2 months before the film's release on March 27, 1998), by Tommy Boy Records and consists of hip hop and R&B music. The album has performances by Adriana Evans, Big Mike, Dave Hollister, Eric Benét, Erick Sermon, Mack 10, Mia X, Naughty by Nature, N.O.R.E., Onyx, Raphael Saadiq, Redman, Somethin' for the People, Tha Eastsidaz, The Roots and Wu-Tang Clan, among others. 

The album reached number 54 on the Billboard 200 and number 13 on the Top R&B/Hip-Hop Albums chart in the United States. Five singles were released from it: "Mourn You Til I Join You", "The Worst", "Callin'", "Jam on It" and "The Weekend".

Track listing

Charts

References

External links 

1998 soundtrack albums
Comedy film soundtracks
Hip hop soundtracks
Contemporary R&B soundtracks
Tommy Boy Records soundtracks
Albums produced by Raphael Saadiq
Albums produced by Battlecat (producer)